Klemen Hribar (born 17 July 1990) is a Slovenian male volleyball player. He is part of the Slovenia men's national volleyball team and plays the position of Libero. He competed at multiple events, the first of which was the 2006–07 Youth European Championships. Most recently, Hribar competed at the 2015 Men's European Volleyball Championship. At club level, he plays for Calcit Kamnik.

See also 
 Slovenia men's national volleyball team

References

External links 
 FIVB 2016 Stats
 
 Player Details
 FIVB News: Slovenia Men's Team Start Preparations for World League
 WorldOfVolley

1990 births
Living people
Sportspeople from Ljubljana
Slovenian men's volleyball players